Medley Hall is the smallest residential college of the University of Melbourne in Australia. Established in 1954, it is situated on 48 Drummond St in Carlton, Victoria, away from other residential colleges in Parkville. It is home to approximately 60 students from around Australia and overseas. Medley Hall was named in honour of Sir John Dudley Gibbs Medley, a previous Vice Chancellor of the University of Melbourne.

Medley Hall was closed from July 2009 to June 2011 due to a building redevelopment. Medley Hall reopened as a residential college from July 2011.

History 

The main building was originally called Benvenuta. It was completed in 1893 for Leah Abrahams, the widow of a small arms dealer. In 1925, Benvenuta was leased to the Commonwealth Government which transformed it into Arbitration Court Offices. Next, the mansion was converted into an Italian club, boasting a ballroom, orchestra and a regular Sunday boxing match, after a period of vacancy.

Benvenuta also has its share of dark history. A bullet hole in the stained glass 'Welcome' window at the top of the stairs is supposedly evidence of criminal activity occurring from 1938 when leased to a North Melbourne vigneron.

Benvenuta's ownership passed to the Italian Consulate prior to Italy's participation in World War II. After the war, Benvenuta was given to the University of Melbourne which then renamed it the Drummond Street Hostel.

In 1953, the management was taken over by the University Council and the first Warden was appointed the following year. In 1955, the hostel was renamed Medley Hall.

Medley Hall is also famous for its appearance in the Nicolas Cage film, Knowing, released in March 2009.

Architecture 
The original building was designed in an Italianate Victorian Baroque style by Walter Scott Law. Construction materials and craftsmen were imported from Italy. This includes stained glass and over 15 tonnes of marble and steel. It is richly decorated including miniature statuettes on the parapets.

After its brief closure between 2009 and 2011, Medley Hall reopened with a new extension behind the original benvenuta.

Facilities 
While Medley Hall is the smallest of the residential colleges, it is not lacking in facilities. It has a newly equipped laundry room with four washing machines and two driers, a lounge room with grand piano, a music room, table tennis and pool, a fully equipped kitchen with TV lounge area and kitchenettes and dining area on each of the three floors of accommodation.

External links 

 http://www.medleyhall.unimelb.edu.au

Residential colleges of the University of Melbourne
Heritage-listed buildings in Melbourne
Italianate architecture in Melbourne
Victorian architecture in Victoria (Australia)
Buildings and structures in the City of Melbourne (LGA)
1954 establishments in Australia
Buildings and structures completed in 1893